Anastasia of Russia may refer to:

Anastasia of Kiev (1023–1074/1096), daughter of Yaroslav the Wise; wife of Andrew I of Hungary
Anastasia Monomachina (died 1067), daughter of Constantine IX Monomachos and first wife of Vsevolod I of Kiev as Princess of Pereyaslavl
Anastasia Yaropolkovna (1074–1159), daughter of Yaropolk Izyaslavich, Prince of Turov and Volyn, and wife of Gleb Vseslavich as Princess of Minsk
Maria of Poland (renamed Anastasia, 1164–1194), daughter of Casimir II the Just, and wife of Vsevolod IV of Kiev
Anastasia Olegovna of Ryazan (?–?), daughter of Oleg II of Ryazan and wife of Kaributas
Anastasia Levievna of Galicia (died 1335), daughter of Lev I of Galicia and wife of Siemowit of Masovia as Duchess of Kuyavia-Brieg
Anastasia Yurievna of Galicia (died 1364/5), daughter of Yuri I of Galicia and wife of Aleksandr Mikhailovich of Tver
Anastasia Alexandrovna of Belz (?–?), daughter of Alexander of Belz and wife of Boleslaw I of Masovia as Duchess of Masovia
Anastasia Yaroslavna of Kiev (?–?), daughter of Yaroslav II of Kiev
Augusta or Anastasia of Lithuania (died 1345), daughter of Gediminas and wife of Simeon of Moscow
Anastasia Dmitriyevna of Moscow (?–?), daughter of Dmitry Donskoy and wife of Ivan of Kholm
Anna Dmitriyevna of Moscow (monastic name Anastasia, born 1387), daughter of Dmitry Donskoy and wife of Yury Patrikiyevich of Lithuania
Anastasia Yurievna of Smolensk (died 1422), daughter of Yury of Smolensk and wife of Yury of Zvenigorod
Anastasia Andreevna of Mozhaysk (died 1451), daughter of Andrey of Mozhaysk and first wife of Boris of Tver
Anastasia Alexandrovna of Suzdal (died 1404?), daughter of Andrey of Mozhaysk and second wife of Boris of Tver
Anastasia Vasilievna of Moscow (died 1470), daughter of Vasily I of Moscow and wife of Alexander Olelka and ancestress of the Olelkovich
Anastasia Romanovna Zakharyina-Yurieva (1530–1560), daughter of Roman Yurievich Zakharyin-Yuriev and first wife of Ivan IV of Russia
Anastasia Petrovna Golovina (?–?), wife of Prince Alexander Gorbatyi-Shuisky
Anastasia Kazanskaya (died 1540), granddaughter of Ivan III of Moscow from his daughter Eudokia, and wife of Prince Feodor Mikhailovich Mstislavsky and Prince Vasili Vasilievich Shuisky
Tsarevna Anastasia Vasilievna of Russia (born 1610), daughter of Vasili IV of Russia
Grand Duchess Anastasia Mikhailovna of Russia (1860–1922), daughter of Grand Duke Michael Nikolaevich of Russia; wife of Frederick Francis III, Grand Duke of Mecklenburg
Princess Anastasia of Montenegro, (1868–1935), daughter of Nicholas I of Montenegro; wife of Grand Duke Nicholas Nikolaevich of Russia as Grand Duchess Anastasia Nikolaevna of Russia
Countess Anastasia Mikhailovna de Torby (1892–1977), morganatic daughter of Grand Duke Michael Mikhailovich of Russia, wife of Harold Augustus Wernher
Grand Duchess Anastasia Nikolaevna of Russia (1901–1918), daughter of Nicholas II of Russia

See also
 Anastasia (disambiguation)
 Anastasia Romanova (disambiguation)